A climbing lane, crawler lane (UK), or truck lane, is an additional roadway lane that allows heavy or underpowered vehicles to ascend a steep grade without slowing other traffic. They are typically used by large trucks or semi-trailer trucks, which go uphill more slowly than they travel on level ground. They are often used on major routes such as motorways and interstate highways.

A more modern variation is to keep an existing lane for slow traffic and make the additional lane a passing lane. This keeps slow traffic in the slowest lane even if drivers neglect to change lanes, while allowing drivers who wish to pass the choice of changing lanes to do so.

Downhill lanes

Some climbing lanes extend slightly over the crest of the hill, to allow slow vehicles to regain speed.

As trucks and recreational vehicles must use low gear to descend slowly, an additional lane may also be built on the downhill side. This prevents the vehicles from overusing their brakes, which may overheat and cause a runaway vehicle.

See also
 2+1 road

References

Road infrastructure